Scott R. Nein of Middletown, Ohio, is an American politician of the Republican party, who formerly served in the Ohio General Assembly.

Early life and education
A graduate of Bowling Green State University, Nein established a career in insurance before going into politics.

Political career 
Nein began public service by serving on the Middletown, Ohio, School Board from 1987 to 1990.

He was encouraged by John Boehner to run for the Ohio House of Representatives to succeed him in 1990.  He did so, and won the seat.  He won reelection in 1992 and 1994.  By his third term Nein was serving as majority floor leader of the House.

When Senator Barry Levey resigned from the Ohio Senate in 1995, Nein was appointed to replace him.  He resigned his seat in the House, and took the seat in the Senate in the same day.  He went on to win election to the seat in 1996 for a full term.  He again won election in 2000.

By 2004, term limits were forcing Nein out of office, and he was succeeded in 2005 by Gary Cates.

Post-political career 
Following his time in elected office, Nein was made CEO of the Ohio Association of Insurance Agents/Independent Insurance Agents of Ohio, where he is serving today.

Personal life 
Senator Nein has three sons, Jason, Beckett and Brody, and a daughter, Courtney.

References

Year of birth missing (living people)
Living people
Republican Party Ohio state senators
People from Middletown, Ohio
Bowling Green State University alumni
21st-century American politicians